Andrew "Boz" Bosworth is an American business executive who has been Chief Technology Officer of Meta since 2022.

After graduating from Harvard University in 2004, he worked as a developer on Microsoft Visio for almost two years, then joined Mark Zuckerberg at Facebook in January 2006, where he helped create News Feed.

Early life and education 
Bosworth was born and raised in Santa Clara County, California. He grew up on a farm in Saratoga and was involved in agricultural endeavors with nonprofit 4-H as a child. Bosworth attended Harvard University and met Mark Zuckerberg while working as a teaching assistant in an artificial intelligence class. Bosworth graduated from Harvard University in 2004.

Career 
Bosworth began his career working for Microsoft as a developer on Microsoft Visio. In 2006, Bosworth received a call from a recruiter looking for a candidate with a background in artificial intelligence. From this, he joined as one of the first 15 engineers at Facebook.

In 2012, Bosworth took initiative over the transition between desktop advertising and mobile advertising, where he oversaw the mobile ad product.

In August 2017, Facebook CTO Mike Schroepfer announced that Bosworth would be transitioning to the role of vice-president for augmented reality and virtual reality, and Mark Rabkin would assume Bosworth's current responsibilities.

Memo controversy 

On June 18, 2016, Bosworth wrote a memo circulated internally within Facebook titled "The Ugly", arguing that connecting people was a paramount goal for Facebook, and justified many of the company's practices. The memo also acknowledged that this could have negative consequences, such as the potential to be used by terrorist attacks coordinated via Facebook. The publication date of the memo was a day after the shooting and death of a Chicago man was recorded via Facebook Live. The memo generated strong, polarized reactions within the company. The memo was leaked to and reported on by BuzzFeed on March 29, 2018.

In a statement given to BuzzFeed after publication of the story, Facebook CEO and principal founder Mark Zuckerberg said: "Boz is a talented leader who says many provocative things. This was one that most people at Facebook including myself disagreed with strongly. We've never believed the ends justify the means. We recognize that connecting people isn't enough by itself. We also need to work to bring people closer together. We changed our whole mission and company focus to reflect this last year."

Responding to the publication of the memo by BuzzFeed, Bosworth wrote: "I don't agree with the post today and I didn't agree with it even when I wrote it. The purpose of this post, like many others I have written internally, was to bring to the surface issues I felt deserved more discussion with the broader company."

Philanthropy 
Bosworth serves as the vice chair on the board of directors for the Peninsula Open Space Trust. He is additionally involved in his local community by being recognized as the 2019 keynote speaker for the Burlingame/SFO Chamber of Commerce. Bosworth also participates in events as an alumnus of nonprofit 4-H, where he has previously received recognition such as the  Distinguished Alumni Medallion award.

Personal life 
Bosworth is married to April Bosworth (née Wood).

References

External links 

Living people
Harvard University alumni
American computer programmers
Facebook employees
Year of birth missing (living people)